The 1962 Montana State Bobcats football team was an American football team that represented Montana State College (now Montana State University) as an independent during the 1962 NCAA College Division football season. In its fifth and final season under head coach Herb Agocs, the team played its home games on campus at Gatton Field in Bozeman and compiled a 7–3 record.

Schedule

References

Montana State
Montana State Bobcats football seasons
Montana State Bobcats football